Upolu is an island in Samoa, formed by a massive basaltic shield volcano which rises from the seafloor of the western Pacific Ocean. With approximately 145,000 inhabitants, it is by far the most populous of the Samoan Islands. Upolu is situated to the southeast of Savai'i, the "big island". Apia, the capital, is in the middle of the north coast, and Faleolo International Airport is at the western end of the island. The island has not had any historically recorded eruptions, although there is evidence of three lava flows, dating back only to between a few hundred and a few thousand years ago.

In the Samoan branch of Polynesian mythology, Upolu was the first woman on the island.

James Michener based his character Bloody Mary in Tales of the South Pacific (later a major character in the Rodgers and Hammerstein musical, South Pacific) on the owner of Aggie Grey's Hotel on the south end of the island. She was still running the hotel in 1960. A branch was later opened in Apia overlooking the harbor.

History
In 1841, the island was the site of the Bombardment of Upolu, an incident during the United States Exploring Expedition.

In the late 19th century, the Scottish writer Robert Louis Stevenson owned a  estate in the village of Vailima in Upolu. He died there in 1894 and is buried at the top of Mount Vaea overlooking his former estate. The Vailima estate was purchased in 1900 to serve as the official residence for the German governor of German Samoa. When the British/Dominion took over governance of the islands, they confiscated the estate and put it to the same use. It later served as the residence for the New Zealand administrator and, after independence, for the Samoan head of state. During World War II the US Navy built Naval Base Upolu on the island.

2009 Samoa tsunami

The island of Upolu was hit by a tsunami at 06:48:11 local time on 29 September 2009 (17:48:11 UTC). Twenty villages on Upolu's south side were reportedly destroyed, including Lepā, the home of Samoa's Prime Minister, Tuila'epa Sa'ilele Malielegaoi. In Lepā, only the church and the village's welcome sign remained standing after the disaster.

Wildlife
An extremely small species of spider lives on Upolu. According to the Guinness Book of World Records, the spider is the size of a period on a printed page.

Depictions in popular culture
Upolu was the filming location for the 1953 South Seas film Return to Paradise, starring Gary Cooper.

The island was also the filming location for several seasons of CBS's competitive reality television series, Survivor. These were: Survivor: Samoa (19th season); Survivor: Heroes vs. Villains (20th season); Survivor: South Pacific (23rd season); and Survivor: One World (24th season).

Two seasons of Australian Survivor were also set on the island: the 3rd season in 2016 and the 4th season in 2017.

One season of Survivor South Africa was set on the island: Survivor South Africa: Island of Secrets (7th season).

Gallery

See also
 1889 Apia cyclone
 Archaeology of Samoa
 Samoa Tourism Authority

Notes

References

External links

 Samoa Tourism Authority

 
Islands of Samoa
Mountains of Samoa
Samoan mythology
Polygenetic shield volcanoes
Volcanoes of Samoa